Arshaq District is in Meshgin Shahr County, Ardabil province, Iran. At the 2006 census, its population was 12,636 in 2,746 households. The following census in 2011 counted 10,364 people in 2,718 households. At the latest census in 2016, the district had 10,296 inhabitants living in 3,226 households.

References 

Meshgin Shahr County

Districts of Ardabil Province

Populated places in Ardabil Province

Populated places in Meshgin Shahr County